Patrick Alphonsus Kennedy (29 July 1903 – 21 August 1981) was an Australian rules footballer who played with Carlton and Hawthorn in the Victorian Football League (VFL).

Family
The youngest son of Daniel Joseph Kennedy (1857–1934) and Bridget Teresa Kennedy, née Noonan (1860–1931), Patrick Alphonsus Kennedy was born at Cobram on 29 July 1903.

Football
Kennedy played VFL football while studying engineering at the University of Melbourne. He was cleared to Carlton from Cobram on in July 1923 and he played 23 games for them over the next couple of years.

In June 1925 Kennedy was cleared to Hawthorn where he added three games to his VFL tally before he returned to Carlton, becoming a member of their 1927 Reserve premiership squad.

Kennedy was subsequently cleared to Sandringham in June 1929 where he played two games.

Military service
Kennedy later served as a major in the Australian Survey Corps from his enlistment during World War II until July 1958.

Death
Patrick Alphonsus Kennedy died in August 1981 and is buried at Springvale Botanical Cemetery.

Notes

External links 

Pat Kennedy's profile at Blueseum

1903 births
1981 deaths
Carlton Football Club players
Hawthorn Football Club players
Sandringham Football Club players
University Blacks Football Club players
Australian rules footballers from Victoria (Australia)
Australian Army personnel of World War II
Australian Army officers
Military personnel from Victoria (Australia)
Burials in Victoria (Australia)
University of Melbourne alumni sportspeople